This is a list of broadcast television stations that are licensed in the U.S. state of Vermont.

Full-power stations
VC refers to the station's PSIP virtual channel. RF refers to the station's physical RF channel.

LPTV stations

Translators

Vermont Cable Networks
Channel 28 & 76.28HD: Duncan Cable TV - Wilmington & Dover Vermont (Vermont Television Network)
Channel 59 & 259HD: Burlington Telecom - Burlington, Vermont (Vermont Television Network)

History
The following stations or translators were once licensed in the state, but have been closed or merged with other stations:
Channel 10: WVTA - Windsor
Channel 19: W19BR (class A, RTV, translator for WNMN) - Monkton
Channel 30: WBVT-CA (class A, RTV, was translator for WNMN) - Burlington
Channel 36: W36AX (PBS, was translator for WVER) - Manchester
Channel 39: WGMU-LP (class A, RTV, translator for WNMN) - Burlington
Channel 47: W14CK (unknown ) - Newport
Channel 51: W51CB (?) - Burlington
Channel 53: W53AS (PBS, was translator for WVTA) - Pownal 
Channel 61: W61CE (RTV, was translator for WNMN) - Rutland
Channel 63: W63AD (ABC, was translator for WVNY) - Rutland
Channel 69: W69AR (CBS, was translator for WCAX-TV) - Rutland (will move to DTV channel 20)

References 

Vermont

Television stations